Sybra rufa is a species of beetle in the family Cerambycidae. It was described by Breuning in 1943.

References

rufa
Beetles described in 1943